Jean-Marie Brohm (born 14 December 1940 in Mulhouse) is a French sociologist, anthropologist and philosopher. Professor of sociology at the University of Montpellier III, he was also the founder of the journal Quel Corps ?, member of the editorial staff of the monthly Répertoire and is actually director of the journal Prétentaine. Brohm has written many books and is the leading proponent of the radical critique of sport in France.

According to Brohm the "[....] critical theory of sport is founded on three principal axes:

1)	Sport is not simply sport but a means of government, a means of pressure on public opinion and a mode of ideological framing of the populations and of parts of the youth, and this in all countries of the world, in totalitarian countries as well as in so called democratic countries. This was noticeable during the big political events which were the Olympic Games in Moscow, the soccer championship in Argentina and, more recently, in France.

2) Sport has become a sector of accumulation of wealth, money, and therefore also of capital. It attracts considerable amounts of money; I would even say today it is the most spectacular showcase of the globalized society of commodities. Sport has become a key commodity of this society.

3) The last point, the ideological aspect properly speaking. Sport constitutes a political body, a space of ideological investment in gestures and movements. You can see this for example with Combat sports. It’s also an ideological valorisation of efforts via asceticism, training, self-sacrifice; sport is presented as an ideological model. Sport institutes a bodily order founded on the management of sexual drives and aggressive impulses; insofar as it seems that sport is a form of social appeasement, social integration, reducing violence, allowing fraternity; this type of discourse to me is a load of muddled illusions and mystifications. We have therefore scrutinized sport starting from these three viewpoints: political, economical, and ideological."

The beginnings of the radical critique of sport
Despite two older articles of Brohm the radical critique of sport really began in 1968 with number 43 («Sport, culture et répression» [Sport, culture and repression]) of the leftist magazine partisans.

"[…] the texts which were published in this issue […] had the effect of a bomb on the world of sport and physical education. Sport and physical education, which up to this time were  considered only in positive terms, were brutally attacked in their very foundations and their social function. In reply, the resistance in both fields was equally violent."

Books (selection)
English
Sport: A Prison of Measured Time, Pluto Press, 1987

French
 Sociologie politique du sport, 1976, second edition : Nancy, P.U.N., 1992, 398 p
 Le mythe olympique, Paris: Bourgois, 1981
 Les dessous de l'olympisme, La Découverte, 1984, Collection : Cahiers libres, with Michel Caillat, 
 Les meutes sportives: Critique de la domination, Paris: L'Harmattan, 1993
 Le corps analyseur: essai de sociologie critique,  Paris: Anthropos, 2001,  
 Le football, une peste émotionnelle : La barbarie des stades, Editions Gallimard, 2006, with Marc Perelman, 
 La tyrannie sportive. Théorie critique d’un opium du peuple, Paris: Beauchesne 2006, 
 Heidegger, le berger du néant, Homnisphères, 2007, with Roger Dadoun and Fabien Ollier

Articles (selection)
«Philosophie du corps? quel corps?» In: Encyclopédie Philosophique Universelle, t. 1, L'Univers Philosophique, Paris: P.U.F, 1989
«Critique des fondements de l'éducation physique et sportive. Les STAPS, une imposture majeure» In: Les Sciences de l'éducation pour l'ère nouvelle, n⁰ 1/2, Université de Caen, 1991
«Tranche de vie et analyse institutionnelle impliquée. L'affaire Brohm» In: Traité d'éducation physique et sportive à l'usage de toutes les générations, Montpellier: Éditions Quel Corps, 1994
«Apparitions des Énigmes. Complémentarisme de l'ethnopsychanalyse et de la phénoménologie» In: Prétentaine, n⁰ 11, janvier 1999

See also
Michael Messner

Sources

External links
 Jean Marie Brohm et la critique du sport
 Jacques Gleyse, « Brohm Jean-Marie. Sociologie politique du sport », Corps et Culture, Numéro 1 (1995), Le développement du sport
 La Théorie critique du sport
 Les enjeux de la critique du sport – interview with Brohm

French sociologists
French philosophers
1940 births
Writers from Mulhouse
Sports historians
Living people
French male non-fiction writers
University of Montpellier alumni